Alizée Jacotey (born 21 August 1984) is a French recording artist, known professionally as Alizée. She was born and raised in Ajaccio, Corsica.

She was discovered by Mylène Farmer, following her winning performance in the talent show, Graines de Star, in 1999. While collaborating with Mylène Farmer and Laurent Boutonnat, she recorded a series of albums that attained immense popularity by pushing the boundaries of lyrical content in mainstream popular music and imagery in her music videos, which became a fixture on NRJ, Europe 1, MTV, Virgin, and many others. Throughout her career, many of her songs have been in top 25 hit lists on the record charts, including "Moi... Lolita", "L'Alizé", "J'en ai marre!" "Gourmandises", "Mademoiselle Juliette", her cover version of "La Isla Bonita", "Parler Tout Bas", "Les collines (never leave you)" and "À cause de l'automne".

Her first two albums were composed by Laurent Boutonnat and written by Mylène Farmer. Her first album, Gourmandises, received Platinum certification within three months of release. After its international launch in 2001, Gourmandises was a success both in France and abroad, earning Alizée the distinction of being the highest selling female French singer in 2001. The album featured her most successful single "Moi... Lolita" which reached number one in several countries in Europe and East Asia, in the UK the song was acclaimed by the New Musical Express who recognised it with a "Single of the Week" award. It became a rare example of a foreign-language song to chart highly in the UK, peaking at number 9.

Gourmandises was followed by a second studio album, Mes Courants Électriques, in 2003. Following its release, Alizée toured during the fall of 2003, performing in 43 concerts throughout France, Belgium and Switzerland.

Alizée married fellow French singer Jérémy Chatelain in late 2003. Following her marriage, she took a hiatus from singing before returning with a new album, Psychédélices on 3 December 2007, which became most popular in Mexico.

Her fourth album titled Une enfant du siècle was released on 29 March 2010 this one of the most acclaimed by the critics. In early 2011 she recorded a duet with Alain Chamfort for his new album Elle & lui.

Released in March 2013, Alizée's fifth studio album, 5, received acclaim from the critics, still with a continuous promotion including the two first songs "À cause de l'automne" and "Je veux bien", her participation in Olly Murs single "Dear Darlin'"

According to the IFPI and SNEP, Alizée is one of the best-selling female French artist of the 21st century and the singer with most exports out of France.

Ajaccio 
The Medal of Ajaccio ("Médaille d'Ajaccio" in French) is issued by the Territorial Collectivity of Corsica. It is the highest civil honor in Corsica.

Buzz Land Awards

Lauriers TV Awards

Petite Princesse (France)

Victoires de la Musique 
The Victoires de la Musique is an annual French award ceremony where the Victoire accolade is delivered by the French Ministry of Culture to recognize the best musical artists of the year. It is the highest musical recognition in France.

Danse avec les stars

DMX Awards (WEB)

Graines de star (France)

Hit FM Award (Russia)

Las Lunas del Auditorio (Mexico)

M6 Awards

MTV Latin America Awards

NME Awards (UK)

NRJ Music Awards

SACEM

Trophée des Anges (France)

World Music Awards 
The World Music Awards is an international awards show founded in 1989 under patronage of Albert II, Prince of Monaco and is based in Monte-Carlo. Awards are presented to the World's best-selling Artists in the various categories and to the best-selling Artists from each major territory. Sales figures are provided by the International Federation of the Phonographic Industry (IFPI). Alizée has received one accolade in 2002.

References 

Alizée
Awards